Gordon Russell Sullivan (born September 25, 1937) is a retired United States Army general, who served as the 32nd Chief of Staff of the Army and as a member of the Joint Chiefs of Staff. Sullivan also served as acting Secretary of the Army.

After retiring from the Army, Sullivan served as the president and chief executive of the Association of the United States Army for 18 years, from 1998 through June 30, 2016. He also served as the chairman of the board of trustees of Norwich University until 2016. He currently serves as chairman of the boards of The Army Historical Foundation and the Marshall Legacy Institute.

Early life and education
Sullivan was born September 25, 1937, in Boston, Massachusetts, and grew up in nearby Quincy. He was commissioned a second lieutenant of Armor and awarded a Bachelor of Arts degree in history from Norwich University in 1959.

Sullivan holds a Master of Arts degree in political science from the University of New Hampshire. His professional military education includes the United States Army Armor School Basic and Advanced Courses, the Command and General Staff College, and the Army War College.

Military career
During his army career, Sullivan served as: Assistant Commandant, United States Army Armor School at Fort Knox, Kentucky from November 1983 to July 1985; Deputy Commandant, United States Army Command and General Staff College at Fort Leavenworth, Kansas from March 1987 to June 1988; Commanding General, 1st Infantry Division (Mechanized) at Fort Riley, Kansas from June 1988 to July 1989; Deputy Chief of Staff for Operations and Plans; and Vice Chief of Staff of the United States Army from 1990 to 1991. His overseas assignments included four tours in Europe, two in Vietnam and one in Korea.

Sullivan culminated his service in uniform as the 32nd Chief of Staff of the United States Army—the senior general officer in the army—and a member of the Joint Chiefs of Staff. As the Chief of Staff of the Army, Sullivan created the vision and led the team that transitioned the army from its Cold War posture. In August 1993, President Bill Clinton assigned the duties and responsibility of acting Secretary of the Army to Sullivan, who continued to serve as chief of staff.

Sullivan retired from the United States Army on July 31, 1995 after more than 36 years of active service. The military march "Architect of Victory" was dedicated to him on the occasion of his retirement.

Post-army career and later life
Sullivan is the co-author, with Michael V. Harper, of Hope Is Not a Method (Random House, 1996), which chronicles the enormous challenges encountered in transforming the post-Cold War army through the lens of proven leadership principles and a commitment to shared values.

Sullivan served as the chairman of the board of trustees of Norwich University, the Army Historical Foundation, and the Marshall Legacy Institute, as well as a member of the MITRE Army Advisory Board, the MIT Lincoln Laboratory Advisory Board, and a Life Trustee of the Woods Hole Oceanographic Institute. He was also the President and Chief Executive Officer of the Association of the United States Army, headquartered in Arlington, Virginia from February 1998 through June 2016.

Sullivan is an Advisory Board Member of Spirit of America, a 501(c)(3) organization that supports the safety and success of Americans serving abroad and the local people and partners they seek to help.

In recognition of his military career and his work with AUSA, Sullivan was awarded the prestigious Sylvanus Thayer Award by the United States Military Academy in 2003, and the AUSA General George Catlett Marshall Medal, the Association's highest honor, in October 2016.

CNA Military Advisory Board

Gen. Sullivan served as the first Chairman of the CNA Military Advisory Board, the first group of retired generals and admirals to examine the national security implications of climate change. Founded in 2006 by Sherri Goodman, the CNA Military Advisory board brought together military leaders from the United States Army, Navy, Air Force, and Marine Corps.   The landmark report of the CNA Military Advisory Board, National Security and the Threat of Climate Change, established the concept of climate change as a “threat multiplier.”   General Sullivan stated in 2007 that the time had arrived to end the debate about climate and take action. When asked about the risk he remarked, “We never have 100 percent certainty. We never have it. If you wait until you have 100 percent certainty, something bad is going to happen on the battlefield.” General Sullivan compared the climate and nuclear threats, stating, “Climate change is exactly the opposite. We have a catastrophic event that appears to be inevitable. And the challenge is to stabilize things—to stabilize carbon in the atmosphere. Back then, the challenge was to stop a particular action. Now, the challenge is to inspire a particular action. We have to act if we’re to avoid the worst effects.”

Personal life
He married Lori Boyle Sullivan in November 2017. He lives in Falmouth, MA. He has three children and three grandchildren. He is an avid reader and historian.He was married to Miriam Gay Loftus until her passing.

Awards and decorations

Medals and ribbons

In fiction
Sullivan appears in the Lee Child book The Enemy, set in January 1990, in which protagonist Jack Reacher believes that the Army Chief of Staff is at the heart of a conspiracy that has left three people dead. Reacher goes to the Pentagon to confront the chief of staff.

It is revealed that the Chief of Staff has actually been helping Reacher's investigation into the murders by making key personnel changes in Army installations in the United States and elsewhere. Sullivan is mentioned by title only, but the Chief of Staff is described in the books as having come up in the Army from the Armored Division. The Chief of Staff also discusses the challenges posed by the end of the Cold War and the resulting restructuring of the Army.

References

External links
 , NU webpage.
 TESTIMONY BEFORE THE U.S. HOUSE OF REPRESENTATIVES, COMMITTEE ON ENERGY AND COMMERCE, SUBCOMMITTEE ON ENERGY AND ENVIRONMENT

|-

|-

1937 births
Living people
People from Boston
United States Army Chiefs of Staff
Norwich University alumni
United States Army personnel of the Vietnam War
United States Army Vice Chiefs of Staff
United States Army Command and General Staff College alumni
United States Army War College alumni
Recipients of the Distinguished Service Medal (US Army)
Recipients of the Legion of Merit
Recipients of the Defense Superior Service Medal
Recipients of the Defense Distinguished Service Medal
Recipients of the Badge of Honour of the Bundeswehr
Recipients of the Order of Military Merit (Brazil)
Officers of the Ordre national du Mérite
American chief operating officers
Recipients of the Medal of Military Merit (Uruguay)
Military personnel from Massachusetts